Domeyko, Domejko, or Domeiko may refer to:

Ignacy Domeyko
Cordillera Domeyko, a mountain range
2784 Domeyko, an asteroid

See also
 Domeykos